The 2022–23 season is the 121st in the history of FK Pardubice and their 19th consecutive season in the top flight. The club will participate in the Czech First League and the Czech Cup.

Players 
.

Out on loan

Pre-season and friendlies

Competitions

Overall record

Czech First League

League table

Results summary

Results by round

Matches 
The league fixtures were announced on 22 June 2022.

Czech Cup

References

FK Pardubice seasons
Pardubice